Bellinger is an unincorporated community located in the towns of Roosevelt and Taft, in Taylor County, Wisconsin, United States. The community was named for an early settler by the name of John Bellinger.

Notes

Unincorporated communities in Taylor County, Wisconsin
Unincorporated communities in Wisconsin